Mount Orab is a small city in Brown County, Ohio, United States. The population was 4,784 as of 2023

History
Mount Orab was laid out in 1850. The village's name most likely is derived from Mount Horeb, a place in the Hebrew Bible. The Cincinnati Eastern Railroad (CCET) passes through Mount Orab.

Geography
Mount Orab is located at  (39.029613, -83.924918).

Demographics

2010 census
As of the census of 2010, there were 3,664 people, 1,381 households, and 1,013 families living in the village. The racial makeup of the village was 97.7% White, 0.7% African American, 0.1% Native American, 0.6% Asian, 0.2% from other races, and 0.7% from two or more races. Hispanic or Latino of any race were 0.6% of the population.

There were 1,381 households, of which 41.2% had children under the age of 18 living with them, 50.8% were married couples living together, 17.2% had a female householder with no husband present, 5.4% had a male householder with no wife present, and 26.6% were non-families. 22.8% of all households were made up of individuals, and 8.6% had someone living alone who was 65 years of age or older. The average household size was 2.64 and the average family size was 3.08.

The median age in the village was 33.7 years. 29.7% of residents were under the age of 18; 8.3% were between the ages of 18 and 24; 27.9% were from 25 to 44; 22.7% were from 45 to 64; and 11.6% were 65 years of age or older. The gender makeup of the village was 47.7% male and 52.3% female.

2000 census
As of the census of 2000, there were 2,307 people, 879 households, and 639 families living in the village. The population density was 607.7 people per square mile (234.4/km2). There were 932 housing units at an average density of 245.5 per square mile (94.7/km2). The racial makeup of the village was 99.22% White, 0.13% African American, 0.22% Native American, 0.04% Asian, and 0.39% from two or more races. Hispanic or Latino of any race were 0.22% of the population.

There were 879 households, out of which 40.6% had children under the age of 18 living with them, 51.5% were married couples living together, 16.6% had a female householder with no husband present, and 27.3% were non-families. 23.4% of all households were made up of individuals, and 11.1% had someone living alone who was 65 years of age or older. The average household size was 2.61 and the average family size was 3.05.

In the village, the population was spread out, with 30.8% under the age of 18, 9.8% from 18 to 24, 30.6% from 25 to 44, 17.5% from 45 to 64, and 11.3% who were 65 years of age or older. The median age was 30 years. For every 100 females there were 86.7 males. For every 100 females age 18 and over, there were 80.5 males.

The median income for a household in the village was $33,798, and the median income for a family was $42,938. Males had a median income of $33,672 versus $21,339 for females. The per capita income for the town was $16,483. About 12.5% of families and 14.6% of the population were below the poverty line, including 20.2% of those under age 18 and 8.7% of those age 65 or over.

Education
The village contains four public schools, Mount Orab Elementary School, Mount Orab Middle School, Western Brown High School and Southern State Community College. Mount Orab has a public library, a branch of the Brown County Public Library.

In the media
Mount Orab was formerly home to the Lake Drive-In movie theater, which was destroyed by a storm in the late 1980s. After the theater was shut down, the management posted "Gone with the Wind" on the marquee, a punning reference to the storm. A local newspaper printed a picture of the marquee prompting rumors that a tornado had taken the theater out during a re-release of Gone with the Wind.

Gallery

References

Villages in Brown County, Ohio
Villages in Ohio
1850 establishments in Ohio
Populated places established in 1850